Mesosetum is a genus of Neotropical plants in the grass family, native to North and South America including the West Indies.

 Species

References

Panicoideae
Poaceae genera